The Egged Bus Company is the largest bus company in Israel, and one of the largest in the world. It operates over 400 bus lines, including internal city lines in many of Israel's cities (in others, the Dan Bus Company, Kavim, Superbus, etc. operate the internal lines), as well as most of Israel's inter-city lines. Below is a list.

While there is no consistent numbering scheme for Egged's lines, it seems to follow a few basic rules:
 Internal lines, and intercity lines in rural areas, are numbered below 100
 Short inter-city and suburban lines are numbered 100–299
 Long-distance lines are numbered 300–999, following some basic rules:
 300–399 is for lines that operate in the Southern District (and some northern lines).
 400–499 is for lines that operate in the Jerusalem District (and some northern lines).
 500–699 were used to lines in the Sharon area (and still in use for very few northern lines). The lines in the Sharon were short distance lines. All lines that were in the Sharon region were transferred to other bus operators such as Kavim and Metropoline.
 700–899 is for lines that connect the Northern District to more southern parts of Israel.
 900–999 is for lines that connect the Haifa District and surrounding areas to more southern parts of Israel.

Each bus line is classified by Egged as 'Regular', 'Express' or 'Direct'. The word  literally means collecting, i.e. the bus either enters each town it passes, or stops at almost every intersection along its route, which usually makes it very slow compared to express buses. Express and direct buses are usually on long-distance routes and might travel at certain sections along the same stretch as other bus routes, but they do not stop at each intersection. On top of that, an express/direct bus is not obligated to pick up short-distance passengers and the driver cannot sell a ticket for a short ride along his route. The express/direct lines are not usually pure non-stop routes, but might have a minimal amount of stops while leaving and entering the different cities. All internal city buses are considered regular/collecting.

Many if not most of Egged's intercity bus lines originate or end in a central bus station/terminal (CBS/CBT). Tel Aviv Central Bus Station is the largest terminal in Israel, and some say the largest in the world.

As previously mentioned, some intercity lines in rural areas are numbered below 100. Those lines are included in the "internal" sections for the large city that they begin or end in. When the bus enters a new municipality, the name of the municipality is bolded.

Some lines may have one or more 'alternative routes' (lit. 'alternative'), in which one or few trips a day will follow a slightly different route instead of the usual one.

Certain lines use armoured buses. Those lines are marked with a small tank icon.

Intracity and Areal

Eilat

Map of Egged bus lines in Eilat (Hebrew)
|-

Haifa and Krayot

Haifa, Tirat Karmel and Nesher

Krayot and Rechasim

Night lines
These lines run every night. Official Egged website page about night lines

Hadera, Pardes Hana Karkur and Zichron Yaacov

Hadera

Pardes Hana Karkur

Zichron Yaakov

Jerusalem

Night lines
During the summer months (July and August), the night lines run every night except Friday night, due to Shabbat. Throughout the year, these lines run only on Thursday and Saturday, and also during Chol Hamoed Pesach and Sukkot, Yom Haatzmaut, and Purim.

Kiryat Shmona

Areal buses in the Galilee Panhandle

Karmiel

South Gush-Dan Areal bus routes

Holon, Bat-Yam, Rishon LeZion and Tel Aviv

Rishon LeZion intracity lines
Map of selected Egged bus lines in Rishon LeZion (Hebrew)

Rehovot, Ness Ziona and Gedera Areal bus routes

Dimona and Yeruham

Ben Gurion Airport 
These routes run throughout Ben Gurion Airport.

Intercity

Short distance

Long distance

Long distance lines oriented at Orthodox population

References

External links
 Egged official website
 Complete updated list of egged bus lines on bus.co.il private info center
 Unofficial Jerusalem Bus Map for Google Maps and Google Earth
 List of Buses from the Jerusalem Central Bus Station to Other Cities, Jerusalem Attractions and Jerusalem Hotels
 Near-complete outdated list of Egged's Jerusalem internal lines (Hebrew only)

Bus lines
Israel
Egged